São Francisco de Paula, Portuguese for Saint Francis of Paola, may refer to:

 São Francisco de Paula, Minas Gerais, a municipality in Minas Gerais
 São Francisco de Paula, Rio Grande do Sul, a municipality in Rio Grande do Sul
 São Francisco de Paula National Forest, national forest in Rio Grande do Sul

See also
 São Francisco (disambiguation)